Fritz Moegle (6 June 1916 – 20 May 1986) was an Austrian art director active in the post-war film industry.

Selected filmography
 White Shadows (1951)
 Adventure in Vienna (1952)
 The Little Czar (1954)
 I'm Marrying the Director (1960)

References

Bibliography 
 Fritsche, Maria. Homemade Men in Postwar Austrian Cinema: Nationhood, Genre and Masculinity. Berghahn Books, 2013.

External links 
 

1916 births
1986 deaths
Austrian art directors
Film people from Vienna